The Wuse bombing was a terrorist attack on the Emab plaza in Wuse, a district of Abuja, the Federal Capital Territory (FCT) of Nigeria.

Incident
The incident was reported to have occurred on June 25, 2014.
The attack was launched by members of Boko Haram, an Islamic sect in northeastern Nigeria. Explosives were used in the attack, leaving 21 people dead and 17 seriously injured. The twin car bombing incident was said to have occurred around 4pm at a shopping mall. According to police report, about 40 vehicles were destroyed by this incident.

See also
Lake Chad attack

References

2014 murders in Nigeria
Boko Haram bombings
Massacres perpetrated by Boko Haram
History of Abuja
Terrorist incidents in Nigeria
Terrorist incidents in Nigeria in 2014
21st century in Abuja
Murder in Abuja
June 2014 events in Africa
Terrorist incidents in Abuja